Colin Hodgkinson (born 14 October 1945, Peterborough, Cambridgeshire, England) is a British rock, jazz and blues bassist, who has been active since the 1960s.

Career
Hodgkinson played in several bands, but was even more prolific as a session and studio musician.

He has worked with Chris Rea, The Eric Delaney Band, Back Door (of which he was co-founder), Alexis Korner, Whitesnake, Jon Lord, Jan Hammer, Paul Butterfield, The Spencer Davis Group, Pete York, and The Electric Blues Duo, as well as with Ian "Stu" Stewart's boogie-woogie band, Rocket 88. In 2007, Hodgkinson became a member of The British Blues Quintet, (along with Zoot Money, Maggie Bell, Miller Anderson and Colin Allen).

Guitar, bass, and sound
Hodgkinson is a musician who has developed a left-hander bass technique which can replace both lead and rhythm guitar if necessary, (as exemplified by his work with the jazz-rock trio Back Door - line-up: saxophone, bass, drums). A typical gig involving Hodgkinson will be a solo slot in which he will render a bass and vocals only rendition of a classic blues song, a particular favourite being his take on Jesse Fuller's "San Francisco Bay Blues." This track was included in his solo album The Bottom Line, issued in 1998, which consists mostly of bass solos.

On 28 October 2008, the Colin Hodgkinson Band released Back Door Too!, recorded with Rod Mason (saxophone) and Paul Robinson (drums).

In March 2014, Hodgkinson was announced as the new bass player for Ten Years After, following the departure of Leo Lyons two months prior.

Solo discography
The Bottom Line - 1998 - In Akustik
 Back Door Too! - 2008 (Rokoko Records)

Selected Discography 
 New Church - Both Sides (1969)
 Alexis Korner - Alexis Korner (1971)
 Alexis Korner - "And..." (1972)
 Back Door - Back Door (1972)
 Back Door - 8th Street Nites (1973)
 Alexis Korner - Mr. Blues (1974)
 Back Door - Another Fine Mess (1975)
 Alexis Korner - Get Off My Cloud (1975)
 Back Door - Activate (1976)
 Jamie Stone (musician) - Let It Shine (1977)
 Alexis Korner - Just Easy (1978)
 Hammer - Hammer (also as Black Sheep) (1979)
 Alexis Korner- The Party Album (1979)
 K2 (band) - Why (1980)
 Alexis Korner - Testament  (2000) LP/CD - live Paris in March 1980
 Alexis Korner - Live in Paris (1994) CD - live Paris in March 1980 - different songs from 'Testament'
 Butterflies - Butterflies (1981)
 Ronnie Jack - Going for the Big One (1981)
 Cozy Powell - Octopuss (1983)
 Schon & Hammer - Untold Passion (1981)
 Schon & Hammer - Here To Stay (1981)
 Whitesnake - Slide It In (1984) (Original UK mix only)
 Alexis Korner - Juvenile Delinquent (1984)
 Mick Jagger - She's The Boss (1985)
 Pete York - Steaming (1985)
 Phil Carmen - City Walls (1986)
 James Young with Jan Hammer - City Slicker (1986)
 Electric Blues Duo - Bitch (1986)
 Konstantin Wecker - Wieder Dahoam (1986)
 Electric Blues Duo - Maker Mine A Double (1987)
 Konstantin Wecker - Live (1987)
 Spencer Davis Group - Extremely Live (1987)
 Konstantin Wecker - Ganz Schön Wecker (1988)
 James Young - Out on a Day Pass (1988)
 Pete York - Superdrumming 1, 2 & 3 (1988)
 Peter Maffay - Leipzig (1990)
 Peter Maffay - 38317 (1991)
 Peter Maffay - Liebe (1991)
 Peter Maffay - Freunde + Propheten (1992)
 Electric Blues Duo & HR Big Band - Electric Blues Duo & HR Big Band (1993)
 Peter Maffay - Tabaluga und Lilli 1 (1993)
 Peter Maffay - Tabaluga und Lilli 2 (1993)
 Alexis Korner - Memorial Concert Volume 2 (1995)
 Electric Blues Duo - Out on the Highway (1995)
 Miller Anderson - Celtic Moon (1998)
 Spencer Davis Group - Payin' Them Blues Dues (1997)
 Woodstock Taylor - Road Movie (1997)
 Electric Blues Duo - Lucky at Cards (1998)
 Jon Lord - Pictured Within (1999)
 Frank Diez - Stranded on Fantasy Island (2000)
 Back Door - Askin' the Way (2003)
 Spencer Davis Group - Official Bootleg 2006 (2006)
 Electric Blues Duo - The last fair Deal (2006)
 The British Blues Quintet - Live in Glasgow (2007)
 Pete York Percussion Band - Pete York & Friends (2008)
 Electric Blues Duo - LIVE! L’Inoui Luxembourg (2010)
 Ten Years After - A Sting in the Tale (2017)

See also
 The Rough Guide To Jazz
 The NME Book of Rock (1976)

References

External links

Colin Hodgkinson

English rock bass guitarists
Male bass guitarists
British jazz bass guitarists
Blues bass guitarists
1945 births
Living people
People from Peterborough
Whitesnake members
British rhythm and blues boom musicians
English session musicians
Musicians from Cambridgeshire
Ten Years After members
The Spencer Davis Group members
British male jazz musicians